Paul Williams (born March 5, 1961) is an American former basketball player. Born in Phoenix, Arizona, he played at St. Mary's High School and led the school to its first boys basketball state championship during his final season. Williams played collegiately for the Arizona State Sun Devils, where he led the team in scoring and rebounding during his junior season in 1981–82. He was nominated to the All-Pac-12 team during his senior season.

Williams was selected by his hometown Phoenix Suns as the 45th pick of the 1983 NBA draft but never played in the National Basketball Association (NBA). He played the 1985–86 season for the Detroit Spirits of the Continental Basketball Association (CBA), averaging 14.1 points in 24 games.

Career statistics

College

|-
| style="text-align:left;"| 1979–80
| style="text-align:left;"| Arizona State
| 29 || 4 || 12.5 || .445 || – || .723 || 1.0 || .6 || .5 || .1 || 4.8
|-
| style="text-align:left;"| 1980–81
| style="text-align:left;"| Arizona State
| 28 || 4 || 19.9 || .457 || – || .760 || 3.1 || 1.5 || .6 || .2 || 7.4
|-
| style="text-align:left;"| 1981–82
| style="text-align:left;"| Arizona State
| 27 || 26 || 37.5 || .466 || – || .689 || 5.8 || 2.4 || 1.1 || .3 || 17.0
|-
| style="text-align:left;"| 1982–83
| style="text-align:left;"| Arizona State
| 33 || 33 || 35.5 || .521 || – || .684 || 7.1 || 2.1 || 1.6 || .2 || 19.7
|- class="sortbottom"
| style="text-align:center;" colspan="2"| Career
| 117 || 67 || 26.5 || .485 || – || .700 || 4.3 || 1.6 || 1.0 || .2 || 12.4

References

External links
College statistics

1961 births
Living people
African-American basketball players
American men's basketball players
Arizona State Sun Devils men's basketball players
Basketball players from Phoenix, Arizona
Detroit Spirits players
Phoenix Suns draft picks
Small forwards
21st-century African-American people
20th-century African-American sportspeople